Eastern Province is the largest, the most populous and the least densely populated of Rwanda's five provinces. It was created in early January 2006 as part of a government decentralization program that re-organized the country's local government structures.

It has seven districts: Bugesera, Gatsibo, Kayonza, Ngoma, Kirehe, Nyagatare and Rwamagana. The capital city of the Eastern Province is Rwamagana.

The Eastern Province comprises the former provinces of Kibungo and Umutara, most of Kigali Rural, and part of Byumba.

The Akagera National Park is situated is this province.

History 
It is not known when the territory of present day Rwanda was first inhabited, but it is thought that humans moved into the area following the last ice age either in the Neolithic period, around ten thousand years ago, or in the long humid period which followed, up to around 3000 BC. Archaeological excavations have revealed evidence of sparse settlement by hunter gatherers in the late Stone Age, followed by a larger population of early Iron Age settlers, who produced dimpled pottery and iron tools. By the 17th century it is thought that most of Rwanda was inhabited, with a fairly even spread of population across the hills of the country.

List of the Eastern Province Districts by Population (2012)

Notes and references

Cited texts

 Briggs, Philip & Booth, Janice (2006) Rwanda - The Bradt Travel Guide. 3rd ed. London: Bradt Travel Guides. 
 Chrétien, Jean-Pierre (2003) The Great Lakes of Africa: Two Thousand Years of History Hardcover ed. Cambridge, MA: MIT Press. 
 Dorsey, Learthen (1994) Historical Dictionary of Rwanda. Scarecrow Press. 
 Ministry of Local Government, Republic of Rwanda (MINALOC): "Eastern Province". Performance contracts in Year 2009-2010 (July 2009-June 2010). Accessed 2010-03-11.
 Munyakazi, Augustine & Ntagaramba, Johnson Funga (2005). Atlas of Rwanda French ed. Oxford: Macmillan Education.

Area calculation

 Pixel sizes for provinces taken from traced maps: North = 28,547; East = 81,548; South = 50,844; West = 51,798; Kigali = 6,129
 Total Pixel size for Rwanda = 28,547 + 81,548 + 50,844 + 51,798 + 6,129 = 218,866
 => Eastern Province % of total area: 81,548 / 218,866 = 37.26%
 Total area of Rwanda = 
 "Rwanda". The World Facebook. United States Central Intelligence Agency. 4 March 2010. Accessed 11 March 2010.
 => Area of Eastern Province =  x 37.26% =

External links
 Eastern Province official website

 
Provinces of Rwanda
States and territories established in 2006